Bonnie S. Klapper is an American lawyer who was Assistant United States Attorney in both the Central District of California and the Eastern District of New York from January 1984 to February 2012. She is in private practice, specializing in the defense of extraditables and in matters before the Office of Foreign Assets Control. She is a member of the bar in the States of New York, California, and the District of Columbia and has been admitted to Federal District Court in New York, California, Florida, Texas and the District of Columbia.

Education
Klapper earned a B.A. from the University of Pennsylvania in 1979. She received her J.D. degree from the University of California, Berkeley School of Law in 1982, graduating Order of the Coif.

Career
Klapper was a district court law clerk from 1982 to 1983 for Wallace Tashima in the Central District of California. Klapper joined the law firm of Tuttle & Taylor in Los Angeles, California, where she worked for two years in the litigation department on  civil litigation. In 1984, Klapper became an Assistant U.S. Attorney in the Central District of California, where she specialized in narcotics money laundering investigations, prosecuting the first Title 31 structuring case in the country. In 1986, Klapper became an Assistant U.S. Attorney in the Eastern District of New York.  She began in that office's money laundering unit in Brooklyn, investigating and prosecuting both drug and non-drug money laundering cases.  In 1989, Klapper moved to that office's Long Island office, where she developed an expertise in money laundering and international narcotics trafficking cases. At that time, she worked with what was then the U.S custom service and the Immigration and Customs and the Internal Revenue Service to help found the El Dorado Task Force, a multi-agency task force set up to combat narcotics money laundering frequently lauded as a model of interagency cooperation.  In 2006, Klapper was asked to return to the Brooklyn office to become one of the founding members of the International Drug Trafficking Section.

In February 2012, Klapper retired from the government, to become a private defense attorney with an office near the Flatiron District in New York. Klapper specializes in domestic and international money laundering cases, international narcotics trafficking cases and cases involving individuals designated by the Treasury Department's Office of Foreign Assets Control. She has consulted on federal cases in districts in California, New York, the District of Columbia, Texas and Florida.

Notable cases

National Mortgage Bank of Greece and Atlantic Bank
This investigation resulted in the convictions of the National Mortgage Bank of Greece, Atlantic Bank and eleven individuals on Title 31 charges for illegally sending tens of millions of dollars from The United States to Greece.

Money Remitter Initiatives
These investigations, which commenced in 1994 and continued through 2007, targeted money remitters agents and licensed money remitters in the greater New York area.  They resulted in the conviction of the four largest licensed money remitters in New York State and approximately 70 money remitter agents, the closure of approximately 50 money remitter stores and the seizure of over $10 million.  U.S. v. Vigo, South American Exchange, Perusa, et al.

Money Order Initiative
This initiative focused on the use of structured money orders to launder drug money. Working both civilly and criminally, the government seized dozens of bank accounts containing over $1 million and successfully prosecuted approximately seven defendants from 1992 to 1996.  Klapper tried and convicted Juan Manuel Ortiz, a violent Cali trafficker with a prior murder conviction who was laundering drug proceeds through money orders in the U.S.  Various civil forfeiture actions, U.S. v. Ortiz

GTO
As a result of the information gathered through the money remitter and Vigo et al. investigations,  the Treasury Department issued a Geographic Targeting Order ("GTO").  This GTO targeted all remittances from the greater New York area to Colombia in excess of $750.  The GTO required the reporting of these remittances on a form similar to that of a currency transaction report to the IRS, which form required sender information and identification.  Within two days of the issuance of the GTO, remittances from the greater New York area to Colombia fell almost 90%, confirming that the vast majority of the remittances consisted of drug proceeds.  Five of the ten largest licensed remitters in the greater New York area either voluntarily closed down or were prosecuted and closed.  The GTO displaced huge amounts of money out of the remitters and on to the streets, resulting in a huge increase in money seizures on the Eastern seaboard, including street seizures, port seizures and even Amtrak seizures.  In total, during the period that the GTO was in existence, approximately one year, El Dorado Task Force and Klapper seized over $4 million attributable to the GTO.  The final result of the GTO was the voluntary lowering of the identification requirement for money remitters sending money to Colombia to $1,000.  In addition, the Treasury Department issued new nonbank financial service regulations to address problems identified during GTO.  Klapper prosecuted and convicted fourteen money remitter owners and employees for violating the GTO.  These prosecutions spanned 1997-1998.

Money Broker Operation
This investigation targeted Colombian money brokers using the Black Market Peso Exchange to launder drug proceeds.  Klapper tried and convicted two money launderers, one of whom was an NYPD police officer, and continued with the identification, indictment, extradition and conviction of three major money brokers, all of whom had laundered tens of million in drug proceeds from the U.S. to Colombia.  This investigation spanned 2000 to 2005.	U.S. v. Zapata, et al.

Norte Valle prosecutions
During the course of the GTO investigation, the El Dorado Task Force, DEA and Klapper identified and prosecuted three money remitter stores for money laundering.  Data from these stores revealed an extraordinary amount of money being laundered to the area of Cartago, Colombia.  Klapper's prosecution of the owner of these stores resulted in the investigation of the Norte Valle Cartel, which was based in Cartago.  The Norte Valle Cartel was one of the most powerful and violent drug cartels in the world.  During its heyday, from approximately 1995 through 2007, the Norte Valle Cartel was responsible for between 50 and 60 percent of the cocaine that entered the United States.   Building on cases stemming from the GTO money remitter cases, Juan Albeiro Monsalve, the Norte Valle Cartel's representative in the U.S. was charged and convicted.  As part of this case, three other individuals were prosecuted and convicted of murder/kidnapping in aid of racketeering.  U.S v. Monsalve, Rojas et al. Starting with the Monsalve prosecution, the investigation worked up the chain to the very highest reaches of the Norte Valle Cartel.  From 2002 to 2009, investigations and prosecutions dismantled the entire leadership of the Norte Valle Cartel, charging, extraditing and convicting 30 defendants.  The defendants convicted included Luis Hernando Gomez Bustamante, also known as "Rasguno," Archangel de Jesus Henao Montoya, also known as "Mocho," and Carlos Arturo Patino, also known as "Patemuro." The investigation also led to the indictment of fugitive Vicente Carillo, leader of the Mexican Juarez Cartel.  U.S. v. Luis Hernando Gomez Bustamante, et al.; United States v. Vicente Carillo

The Venezuela investigation
Building on the Norte Valle investigation, ICE El Dorado, DEA and Klapper commenced an investigation which identified a major trafficking organization which was a pioneer in the use of Venezuela as a trans-shipment point for cocaine traveling from Colombia to Mexico and on to the United States.  Between 2005 and 2007, this organization sent approximately 85,000 kilograms of cocaine from Colombian to the United States.  This investigation led to the indictment and conviction of fourteen individuals who were the leaders of this organization and the complete dismantling of the organization.  In addition, it led to the indictment of fugitive Miguel Trevino, also known as Z-40, the leader of los Zetas, Mexico's most violent cartel.  U.S. v. Beltran Cristancho, Herrera, Tello Candelo

The Panama investigation/Valenciano
Building on evidence obtained during the Norte Valle and Venezuela investigations, the El Dorado Task Force, DEA and Klapper obtained an indictment and conviction of Maximiliano Bonilla, also known as Valenciano.  Bonilla was one of the most violent traffickers operating in Colombia.  The investigation revealed that Bonilla was using Panama and Venezuela as a trans-shipment route for container-loads of cocaine once the route through Venezuela had been shut down and selling massive quantities of cocaine to the violence Mexican organizations, Los Zetas. Valenciano became a fugitive, was arrested in Venezuela and eventually sent to the United States, where he awaits sentencing. U.S. v. Maximiliano Bonilla, et al.

The Don Lucho Super Cartel
During the last years of her career as an Assistant U.S. Attorney, Klapper was the lead prosecutor, working with ICE and DEA agents domestically in New York, Tampa, and Colombia, Mexico and Argentina, of the Luis Caicedo Organization.  Klapper and the agents identified, obtained indictments of and convicted the entire hierarchy of this organization, from its leaders to its suppliers, transporters and money laundering, thereby dismantling an organization that became known as the Super Cartel because of the staggering quantity of cocaine it exported to the United States and Europe. Conservative estimates are that this organization sent approximately 800,000 kilograms of cocaine from Colombia to the U.S. and laundered approximately $4 billion during a six-year period.  Over 20 individuals were convicted, approximately $173 million in drug money was seized, approximately 3,800 kilos was seized, and several fast boast and semisubmersibles were seized.  CBS 60 Minutes did a 1-hour special on this called .

In popular media
Klapper and Special Agent Romedio Viola, the agent with whom she worked during most of her career, were the subject of a book published in 2011 called The Takedown: A Suburban Mom, the Son of a Coal Miner and the Unlikely Demise of Colombia's Brutal Norte Valle Cartel by investigative author Jeffrey Robinson.  The book details Klapper's and Viola's 15-year effort to identify and systematically dismantle the Norte Valle Cartel which, at its pinnacle, was responsible for 50% and 60% of the cocaine which entered the United States. It describes the contract placed on her and Viola's lives, by Carlos Arturo Patino, alias "Patemuro," a violent cartel leader who sought retribution against the two for his arrest by hiring a contract killer to murder them, and the efforts by cartel leader Luis Hernando Gomez Bustamante, also known as "Rasguno," and his attorney, to discredit the two personally and professionally, in retribution for his conviction.

Klapper and Romedio’s work was featured in the CNN show Declassified episode "the North Valle Cartel", which aired on October 6, 2019. Klapper is also featured in the National Geographic Series “Drug Lords – Next Generation.”

Klapper has been interviewed in the US, South America and Europe as an expert in the areas of drug trafficking, money laundering and legal ethics and has acted as a legal commentator for Vice Media, the BBC and the Guardian.

Klapper’s work rescuing dogs from the cartel/gang wars in Mexico has featured in print media and on radio.

References

External links

Living people
1957 births
People from Brooklyn
University of Pennsylvania alumni
UC Berkeley School of Law alumni
California lawyers
New York (state) lawyers